Torchbearer may refer to:

The Torch Bearer, a 1916 American silent film
The Torchbearer, a 2005 Czech animated short film
The Torchbearers, a sculpture at the University of Texas at Austin
Torchbearers International, a network of Bible schools
VAW-125, a United States Navy squadron known as the Torch Bearers
A person who carries the Olympic Torch

See also
 Keeper of the Flame (disambiguation)
 Torch (disambiguation)
 Bearer (disambiguation)